Trial by Media is a true crime documentary miniseries that premiered May 11, 2020 on Netflix.

Summary
The series focuses on famous court cases from the 1980s-2000s that are believed to have had their outcome affected by extensive media coverage.

Episodes

Reception 
The series received generally positive reception. Metacritic gave the series a weighted average score of 69 out of 100 based on 7 reviews, indicating "generally favorable reviews". Review aggregator Rotten Tomatoes reported an approval rating of 86% based on 14 reviews, with an average rating of 6.85/10 for the series. The website's critical consensus states, "A fascinating time capsule that doesn't draw many conclusions, Trial by Media considers the consequences of broadcasting high-profile court cases."

References

External links
 
 
Official trailer

2020 American television series debuts
2020 American television series endings
2020s American documentary television series
English-language Netflix original programming
Netflix original documentary television series
Television series about the media